The Affordaplane (sometimes written Afford-A-Plane) is an American plans-built, high wing, strut-braced, single engine, tractor configuration, conventional landing gear equipped ultralight aircraft for the US FAR 103 Ultralight Vehicles rules.  Designed by Dave Edwards, it is intended for amateur construction. The aircraft plans claim it can be built out of readily sourced and inexpensive materials using common tools in 150 to 250 hours construction time.

Design and development
The Affordaplane is constructed of an 6061 T-6 aluminum tube fuselage and other structural components, using both square and round aluminum tube.  Wings are a "ladder-type" cross-brace structure supported by struts and covered in doped fabric. Builders have the option of constructing the ribs out of aluminum tube or rigid foam. Instead of welding, structural components are attached with riveted or bolted aluminum gussets. The cockpit is exposed with a plexiglass or Lexan windshield. The controls are conventional 3-axis.

When built as a Part 103 ultralight, the aircraft is intended to be powered by a 26 hp (19 kW) Rotax 277, 35 hp (26 kW) Rotax 377, or similar engine. Heavier and more powerful engines including the Rotax 503 may also be used, but will result in exceeding the FAR Part 103 254 pound (115 kg) empty weight limit, if the aircraft is otherwise built as designed. The plans recommend Rotax engines, but the Half VW, Kawasaki 340 and Kawasaki 440 have also been used.

The Affordaplane has a unique single acting aileron control surface approximately the entire length of the wing.  Some builders have configured these as flaperons but the plans do not include details for this modification.

Variants
The plans are drawn as a single-seat version.  At least one builder has constructed a two-seat, tandem version.

Specifications (ultralight configuration)

See also

References

External links

Ultralight aircraft
Homebuilt aircraft